The New Beginning in Hiroshima was a professional wrestling event promoted by New Japan Pro-Wrestling (NJPW). The event took place on February 10 and 11, 2021 in Hiroshima, Hiroshima at the Hiroshima Sun Plaza Hall. It was the thirty-first event promoted under the NJPW The New Beginning name and the second in Hiroshima, the last being The New Beginning in Hiroshima in 2014.

The event featured thirteen matches across both days. The first day was main evented by Hiromu Takahashi making his first defence of the IWGP Junior Heavyweight Championship against Sho. The first day also features Guerrillas of Destiny defending the IWGP Tag Team Championship against Dangerous Tekkers. The second night main event saw Kota Ibushi face against Sanada for the IWGP Heavyweight and IWGP Intercontinental Championships.

Production

Background 
Since 2020, NJPW has unable to run events with a full arena capacity due to COVID-19 restrictions. The New Beginning is NJPW's first major show after their annual January 4 Tokyo Dome Show, which is their biggest show of the year.

Storylines 
The New Beginning in Hiroshima's events featured thirteen professional wrestling matches across both days that involve different wrestlers from pre-existing scripted feuds and storylines. Wrestlers portray villains, heroes, or less distinguishable characters in the scripted events that build tension and culminate in a wrestling match or series of matches.

At the G1 Climax 30 final, Kota Ibushi defeated Sanada to win the tournament for the second time in a row. At Wrestle Kingdom 15, Ibushi won the IWGP Heavyweight Championship for the first time in his career and the IWGP Intercontinental Championship the second time after defeating Tetsuya Naito in the first night's main event. The next night, he successfully defended both belts against Jay White. Ibushi then proclaimed that her had finally 'became god' and declared he would seek to unify the IWGP Heavyweight & Intercontinental belts. After the defence, Sanada came into the ring and challenged Ibushi for the belts, asking if Ibushi would accept 'the gift' of Sanada, which Ibushi accepted. The match was made for The New Beginning in Hiroshima's second night on February 11.

During the 2020 Best of the Super Juniors tournament, Sho defeated eventual tournament winner Hiromu Takahashi in their round-robin match. At Wrestle Kingdom, Takahashi won the IWGP Junior Heavyweight Championship for the fourth time against Taiji Ishimori and after the match, nominated Sho as his desired first challenger. This will be Sho's first challenge for the belt in his career as he has been primarily a tag team wrestler working with Yoh and Rocky Romero as Roppongi 3K. The match was made for The New Beginning in Hiroshima's first night on February 10.

Results

Night 1 (February 10)

Night 2 (February 11)

See also

 2021 in professional wrestling
 List of NJPW major events

References

External links 
 Official New Japan Pro-Wrestling's website

February 2021 events in Japan
2021 in professional wrestling